James Edward McTamany (born July 4, 1863 – April 16, 1916), was an outfielder in Major League Baseball from 1885 to 1891. McTamany played for the Brooklyn Grays, Kansas City Cowboys, Columbus Solons, and the Philadelphia Athletics.

As a hitter, McTamany drew a lot of walks, finishing in the top three of the American Association each year from 1888 to 1891. He led the league with 140 runs scored in 1890.

McTamany was also a good defensive outfielder. He played mostly center field and was among the league leaders in putouts and assists for several seasons.

See also
List of Major League Baseball career stolen bases leaders
List of Major League Baseball annual runs scored leaders
List of Major League Baseball single-game hits leaders

References

1863 births
1916 deaths
19th-century baseball players
Major League Baseball outfielders
Baseball players from Pennsylvania
Brooklyn Grays players
Kansas City Cowboys players
Columbus Solons players
Philadelphia Athletics (AA 1891) players
Lancaster Ironsides players
Baltimore Monumentals (minor league) players
Rochester Flour Cities players
York White Roses players
Indianapolis Hoosiers (minor league) players